Star Control: Origins is an action-adventure game developed and published by Stardock Entertainment for Microsoft Windows, released September 20, 2018.

Gameplay 
Star Control: Origins begins in the year 2086, where the human space agency Star Control launches Earth's first interstellar-capable ship to investigate an alien distress signal. The player assumes the role of the captain of that ship. The game follows the template of original Star Control series as an action-adventure game, combining planetary exploration, diplomacy with alien races, and ship-to-ship space battles. The one-on-one "Fleet Battles" take place in a 2D top-down arena, with each type of ship having two different abilities. Through the game's story, characters provide quests that direct the player to explore different places in the galaxy. Players can send a planetary lander to explore planets and gather resources, and the game adds a new planetary-landing minigame. The game allows players to upgrade their ships, including abilities that automate combat, planetary resource-gathering, and piloting between destinations. There is also a Fleet Battles multiplayer mode, which can be played against other people online, or against an AI opponent.

Development 
In 2013, Atari filed for bankruptcy, and auctioned its assets in the dormant Star Control franchise. That summer, Stardock became the highest bidder on the "Star Control" trademark and the copyright in the original material of Star Control 3, though Atari's assets did not include the copyright to other games in the franchise.

Stardock built their game using the Nitrous Engine, with the style of writing and visual art inspired by Star Control II. By 2017, they announced delays and changes in plans, forcing them to cancel their planned Defense of the Ancients-style combat system, while still allowing players to play a public beta of their one-on-one Super Melee system in November. The reported budget for Star Control: Origins was $10 million, with additional costs for marketing and promotion.

In 2014, Stardock initially told Ars Technica that they would create Star Control: Origins as a prequel, taking place 43 years before the events of Star Control. Stardock CEO Brad Wardell sought to involve creators of the original Star Control series. When both Fred Ford and Paul Reiche III declined, Stardock reported that the original developers "cannot be officially involved" due to their contracts with Activision, and that the company would "be talking to Paul and Fred as we go forward". In 2015, Stardock announced that their new game would take place "before the events of the original series". By October 2017, Stardock represented that they were speaking frequently with the original Star Control creators, reiterating that Origins would take place in an alternate universe, branching from the original series' universe. Reiche and Ford said that their games had "absolutely no connection, hyper-dimensional or otherwise", and that Stardock had not negotiated their legal permissions. This became an issue in an ensuing lawsuit, Stardock Systems, Inc. v. Reiche, leading to Origins being set in a separate universe from the original series.

Intellectual property

Original ownership and split 
Both Star Control and Star Control II were created by Paul Reiche III and Fred Ford under their Toys for Bob studio, with Accolade publishing the titles in the early 1990s. Star Control II is critically acclaimed among the best games of all time, with high demand for a sequel. By the early 2000s, the Accolade's publishing agreement with Reiche and Ford expired. Reiche and Ford still owned the copyrights in Star Control I and II, but they could not successfully purchase the Star Control trademark, leading them to consider a new title for a potential follow-up. This led them to remake Star Control II as The Ur-Quan Masters, which they released in 2002 as a free download under an open source copyright license.

Meanwhile, the Star Control trademark and copyright for III was transferred to Infogrames Entertainment. This happened when Star Control publisher Accolade sold their company to Infogrames in 1999, who merged with Atari and re-branded under the Atari name in 2003. In 2011, GOG.com began selling a Star Control re-release on their digital store.  Ford contacted the sales platform, saying they could not sell the games without permission, leading GOG.com to separately license the Star Control trademark from Atari, and the games themselves from Reiche and Ford. Atari declared bankruptcy in 2013, and their assets were listed for auction.

Stardock acquisition 
Stardock became the top bidder on Atari's Star Control intellectual property. Upon hearing the news, Paul Reiche indicated that he still owned the copyright in the original Star Control games, so Stardock must have purchased the Star Control trademark, and this was confirmed by Stardock. Indeed, the Atari asset purchase agreement listed two assets sold to Stardock: the Star Control trademark and the Star Control III copyright. As Stardock began developing their new Star Control game, they re-iterated that they did not acquire the copyright to the first two games, and that they would need a license from Reiche and Ford to use their content and lore. Reiche and Ford echoed this understanding in a 2015 Game Developer Conference interview, stating that Stardock's game would use the Star Control trademark only.

In September 2015, Stardock announced that Origins would be a prequel to Star Control. Through email, Stardock tried to license character designs from Star Control, but creators Reiche and Ford repeatedly declined. By 2016, Stardock described Origins as an alternative timeline in the same Star Control multiverse, but with none of the older games' characters, to avoid infringing on Reiche and Ford's copyrighted lore. Despite Stardock's continued offers, Reiche and Ford declined to collaborate on Origins, citing a desire to create their own sequel once they finished their ongoing projects with Activision.

Lawsuit 
In October 2017, Stardock began selling the older Star Control games via the Steam store, as a promotion for Origins. Through email, the parties began to dispute what legal rights Stardock had purchased from Atari, and whether that included distribution rights over the original series. Despite private negotiations, Stardock declined to stop selling the games, leading Reiche and Ford to formally request that Steam remove the original series from their store via a Digital Millennium Copyright Act (DMCA) takedown notice. Stardock formally contested the notice, and the sales continued.

Also in October, Reiche and Ford announced Ghosts of the Precursors as a direct sequel to Star Control II. Initially, Stardock supported this announcement for Ghosts of the Precursors as a "true sequel to Star Control 2", and claimed their new Origins game would take place in an alternate universe that split off from the original series' universe. By December 1, Reiche and Ford announced that Stardock had not negotiated their legal permissions, and that "our games' universe has absolutely no connection, hyper-dimensional or otherwise". Responding to allegations that Stardock threatened to stop Reiche and Ford from releasing Ghosts of the Precursors, Stardock announced their lawyers would handle the dispute.

By December 2017, Stardock filed a lawsuit against Reiche and Ford for infringing the Star Control trademark when they announced Ghosts of the Precursors as a "direct sequel" to Star Control II. Soon after, the pair responded with a counter-suit against Stardock for copyright infringement, contesting the re-sale of the original games and the unauthorized use of their original characters and designs. In the months that followed, Stardock applied for more than 20 new trademarks, and filed an amended claim in March 2018 to claim ownership over them. These trademark applications included names of alien races from the original Star Control, and the trademark for the community managed open-source remake, The Ur-Quan Masters.

Outcome 
In September 2018, Stardock filed a motion with the Court requesting a preliminary injunction preventing Reiche and Ford from issuing a DMCA takedown notice against Stardock's forthcoming Origins game. Judge Saundra Brown Armstrong denied Stardock's request on December 27, agreeing with Reiche and Ford that Stardock had been aware of the intellectual property issues by their own admission, but still started work on a potentially infringing product, calling the situation one of Stardock's own making. After the ruling, Reiche and Ford issued a DMCA takedown notice to Steam and GOG.com. Stardock did not file a counter-notice, and the games were subsequently removed from sale at the beginning of 2019. Later that month, both Steam and GOG.com restored Origins for sale. When Stardock owner Brad Wardell mentioned that the digital stores had reviewed and reconsidered the takedown, Polygon revealed correspondence where Stardock offered to accept potential copyright liability and secure both stores from the consequences of litigation.

In June 2019, the parties reached a legal settlement, agreeing that Stardock will own the Star Control trademark, and Reiche and Ford will own The Ur-Quan Masters trademark. Stardock also agreed to avoid using any plots, characters, or locations that would infringe on Reiche and Ford's copyrights, with the parties committing to discuss further disputes. As part of this, Stardock dropped their trademark claims to the alien names from the first two games. Reiche and Ford also agreed to remain quiet about Ghosts of the Precursors for a few years, and that their game would be renamed as part of the agreement. One of the unusual agreements in the settlement was that Stardock's owner Brad Wardell would provide Paul Reiche with honey from his bee hives, in return for which Reiche will provide Wardell with mead.

Reception

Star Control: Origins has a Metacritic score of 75, indicating "generally favorable reviews". Yahtzee Croshaw of Zero Punctuation ranked it 4th on his list of the Top 5 Best Games of 2018. IGN's Dan Stapleton gave Star Control: Origins a review score of 6.9/10 praising the game's combat system and humorous dialogue, but criticizing the repetitive gameplay of planetary resource gathering. This was echoed by PC Gamer's Ian Birnbaum, who  gave Star Control: Origins a review score of 60/100 criticizing the game's depth and the amount of grinding in gathering resources on planets, while still praising the humor in the dialog. Richard Corbett of PC Gamer would later acknowledge issues with the game's mechanics, while still praising Origins as his favorite game story in 2018. GameSpot's David Wildgoose rated the game at 6/10, stating "at its best, Star Control: Origins urges you to poke and prod into every corner of its intimidatingly vast galaxy, searching out ancient secrets and pun-filled absurdities. At its worst, it drags you through mediocre arcade sequences and generic grind". Stardock reports that Star Control: Origins received 10,000 pre-orders, leading to sales of 50,000 copies after one week of distribution.

References

External links 
 

2018 video games
Action-adventure games
Multiplayer and single-player video games
Science fiction video games
Star Control
Stardock games
Video games set in the 2080s
Video games developed in the United States
Video game sequels
Video game prequels
Unauthorized video games
Video games involved in plagiarism controversies
Windows games
Windows-only games